Geheimrat Julius Wilhelm Theodor Curtius (27 May 1857 – 8 February 1928) was professor of Chemistry at Heidelberg University and elsewhere. He published the Curtius rearrangement in 1890/1894 and also discovered diazoacetic acid, hydrazine and hydrazoic acid.

History

Theodor Curtius was born in Duisburg in the Ruhr area in Germany. He studied chemistry with Robert Bunsen at Heidelberg University and with Hermann Kolbe at Leipzig University. He received his doctorate in 1882 in Leipzig.

After working from 1884 to 1886 for Adolf von Baeyer at the University of Munich, Curtius became the director of the analytical chemistry department at University of Erlangen until 1889. Then he accepted the chair in Chemistry at the University of Kiel, where he remained very productive. In line with this success, Curtius was appointed Geheimer Regierungsrat (Privy Councillor) in 1895. After a one-year appointment as the successor of the famous August Kekulé at Bonn University in 1897, Curtius succeeded Victor Meyer as Professor of Chemistry at his old university in Heidelberg in 1898, where he remained until his retirement in 1926. He was succeeded by Karl Freudenberg, who wrote Curtius' biography in 1962.

In his free time, he also composed music, sang in concerts, and was an active mountaineer. In 1894 he founded the Kiel section of the Association of German and Austrian Alpinists, which he personally supported with gifts. In his Munich period, he became a close friend of the alpinist guide Christian Klucker, with whom he made mountaineering hikes for many years thereafter.

Theodor Curtius died in Heidelberg on 8 February 1928.

The Heidelberg University Archives has, in its possession, a photo album from 1907 marking the 25th anniversary of Theodor Curtius receiving his Doctorate. It shows pictures of science scholars, buildings, and labs such as the physio-chemical, pharmaceutical, and organics labs, and much more.

Major publications by Curtius
Curtius wrote over 300 publications. Several had a significant impact on chemical science.

 Diazo- und Azoverbindungen der Fettreihe, Barth, Leipzig (1888)
 Studien mit Hydrazin, Barth, Leipzig, Bd 1,2 (1896), Bd 3,4 (1918)
 Einwirkung von Basen auf Diazoessigester, Berlin (1911)
 Die reduktion der aromatische Aldazine und Ketazine, Barth, Leipzig (1912)
 Hydrazide und Azide der Azidofettsäuren, Berlin (1912)
 Die Einwirkungen von Hydrazin auf Nitroverbindungen, Barth, Leipzig (1913)

Curtius family
The Curtius family is historically from Bremen area. Several other members of the family were notable.

See also
 Curtius

References

External links
 Royal Society of Chemistry, Historical Group, short biography of Curtius
 University of Kiel history of the inorganic department
 Heidelberg University
 German Alpen Association, Kiel section

1857 births
1928 deaths
20th-century German chemists
Academic staff of the University of Bonn
German mountain climbers
19th-century German chemists
Members of the Göttingen Academy of Sciences and Humanities